A fire sprinkler system is an active fire protection method, consisting of a water supply system providing adequate pressure and flowrate to a water distribution piping system, to which fire sprinklers are connected. Although initially used only in factories and large commercial buildings, systems for homes and small buildings are now available at a cost-effective price. 

Fire sprinkler systems are extensively used worldwide, with over 40 million sprinkler heads fitted each year.  Fire sprinkler systems are generally designed as a life saving system, but are not necessarily designed to protect the building. Of buildings completely protected by fire sprinkler systems, if a fire did initiate,  it was controlled by the fire sprinklers alone in 96% of these cases.

History 

Leonardo da Vinci designed a sprinkler system in the 15th century. Leonardo automated his patron's kitchen with a super-oven and a system of conveyor belts. In a comedy of errors, everything went wrong during a huge banquet, and a fire broke out. "The sprinkler system worked all too well, causing a flood that washed away all the food and a good part of the kitchen."

Ambrose Godfrey created the first successful automated sprinkler system in 1723. He used gunpowder to release a tank of extinguishing fluid.

The world's first modern recognizable sprinkler system was installed in the Theatre Royal, Drury Lane in the United Kingdom in 1812 by its architect, William Congreve, and was covered by patent No. 3606 dated the same year. The apparatus consisted of a cylindrical airtight reservoir of 400 hogsheads (c. 95,000 litres) fed by a  water main which branched to all parts of the theatre. A series of smaller pipes fed from the distribution pipe were pierced with a series of  holes which would pour water in the event of a fire.

Frederick Grinnell improved Henry S. Parmalee's design and in 1881 patented the automatic sprinkler that bears his name. He continued to improve the device and in 1890 invented the glass disc sprinkler, essentially the same as that in use today.

"Until the 1940s, sprinklers were installed almost exclusively for the protection of commercial buildings, whose owners were generally able to recoup their expenses with savings in insurance costs. Over the years, fire sprinklers have become mandatory safety equipment" in some parts of North America, in certain occupancies, including, but not limited to newly constructed "hospitals, schools, hotels and other public buildings", subject to the local building codes and enforcement. However, outside of the US and Canada, sprinklers have rarely been mandated by building codes for normal hazard occupancies which do not have large numbers of occupants (e.g. factories, process lines, retail outlets, petrol stations, etc.)

Sprinklers are now commonly installed in non-industrial buildings, including schools and residential premises. This is largely as a result of lobbying by the National Fire Sprinkler Network, the European Fire Sprinkler Network, and the British Automatic Fire Sprinkler Association.

Usage
Sprinklers have been in use in the United States since 1874, and were installed into factory applications where fires at the turn of the century had often catastrophic in terms of both human and property losses.

Sprinklers may be required to be installed by building codes, or may be recommended by insurance companies to reduce potential property losses or business interruption. US building codes for places of assembly (generally over 100 persons) and places with overnight sleeping accommodation such as hotels, nursing homes, dormitories, and hospitals, usually require sprinklers either under local building codes, as a condition of receiving State and Federal funding, or as a requirement to obtain certification (essential for institutions who wish to train medical staff).

Regulations

United States 
The primary fire code writing organization is the private National Fire Protection Association or NFPA.  NFPA sets the standards for technical aspects of sprinklers installed in the USA.  Building codes, which specify which buildings require sprinklers are generally left to local jurisdictions.  However, there are some exceptions:

In 1990 the US passed PL-101-391, better known as the Hotel and Motel Fire Safety Act of 1990. This law requires that any hotel, meeting hall, or similar institution that receives federal funds (i.e. for overnight stay, or a conference, etc.), must meet fire and other safety requirements. The most visible of these conditions is the implementation of sprinklers. As more and more hotels and other public accommodations upgraded their facilities to enable business with government visitors, this type of construction became the de facto industry norm – even when not directly mandated by any local building codes.

If building codes do not explicitly mandate the use of fire sprinklers, the code often makes it highly advantageous to install them as an optional system. Most US building codes allow for less-expensive construction materials, larger floor area limitations, longer egress paths, and fewer requirements for fire-rated construction in structures which are protected by fire sprinklers. Consequently, the total building cost is often decreased by installing a sprinkler system and saving money in the other aspects of the project, as compared to building a non-sprinklered structure.

In 2011, Pennsylvania and California became the first US states to require sprinkler systems in all new residential construction. However, Pennsylvania repealed the law later that same year. Many municipalities now require residential sprinklers, even if they are not required at the state level.

Europe
In Norway as of July 2010, all new housing of more than two storeys, all new hotels, care homes, and hospitals must be sprinklered. Other Nordic countries require or soon will require sprinklers in new care homes, and in Finland  a third of care homes were retrofitted with sprinklers. A fire in an illegal immigrant detention center at Schiphol Airport in the Netherlands on 27 October 2005 killed 11 detainees, and led to the retrofitting of sprinklers in all similarly-designed prisons in the Netherlands. A fire at Düsseldorf Airport on 11 April 1996 which killed 17 people led to sprinklers being retrofitted in all major German airports. Most European countries also require sprinklers in shopping centers, in large warehouses, and in high-rise buildings.

Renewed interest in and support for sprinkler systems in the UK has resulted in sprinkler systems being more widely installed. In schools, for example, the government has issued recommendations through Building Bulletin 100, a design guide for fire safety in schools, that most new schools, except for a few low risk schools, should be constructed with sprinkler protection. that most new schools should be constructed with sprinkler protection. In 2011, Wales became the first country in the world where sprinklers are compulsory in all new homes. The law applies to newly built houses and blocks of flats, as well as care homes and university halls of residence. In Scotland, all new schools are sprinklered, as are new care homes, sheltered housing and high rise flats.

In the UK, since the 1990s sprinklers have gained recognition within the Building Regulations (England and Wales) and Scottish Building Standards and under certain circumstances, the presence of sprinkler systems is deemed to provide a form of alternative compliance to some parts of the codes. For example, the presence of a sprinkler system will usually permit doubling of compartment sizes and increases in travel distances (to fire exits) as well as allowing a reduction in the fire rating of internal compartment walls.

Operation 

Each closed-head sprinkler is held closed by either a heat-sensitive glass bulb or a two-part metal link held together with fusible alloy. The glass bulb or link hold in place a pipe cap which acts as a plug to prevent water from flowing, unless the ambient temperature around the sprinkler reaches the design activation temperature of the individual sprinkler head. In a standard wet-pipe sprinkler system, each sprinkler activates independently when the predetermined heat level is reached. Thus, only sprinklers near the heat of the fire will operate, normally just one or two. This maximizes water pressure over the point of fire origin, and minimizes water damage to the building.

A sprinkler activation will usually do less water damage than a fire department hose stream (which provide approximately 900 litres/min (250 US gallons/min). A typical sprinkler used for industrial manufacturing occupancies discharges about 75–150 litres/min (20–40 US gallons/min).

In addition, a sprinkler will usually activate within one to four minutes of the fire's start, whereas it typically takes at least five minutes for a fire department to register an alarm and drive to the fire site, and an additional ten minutes to set up equipment and apply hose streams to the fire. This additional time can result in a much larger fire, requiring much more water to extinguish.

Types

Wet pipe
By a wide margin, wet pipe sprinkler systems are installed more often than all other types of 'fire sprinkler systems. They also are the most reliable, because they are simple, with the only operating components being the automatic sprinklers and (commonly, but not always) the automatic alarm check valve. An automatic water supply provides water under pressure to the system piping.

Wet systems may optionally be charged with an antifreeze chemical, for use where pipes cannot reliably be kept above .

While such systems were once common in cold areas, after several fires caused by systems filled with too high a percentage of antifreeze, the regulatory authority in the United States effectively banned new antifreeze installations.  A sunset date of 2022 applies to older antifreeze systems in the US. This regulatory action has greatly increased costs and reduced options for cold weather sprinkler systems.

Dry pipe

Dry pipe systems are the second most common sprinkler system type. Dry pipe systems are installed in spaces in which the ambient temperature may be cold enough to freeze the water in a wet pipe system, which makes the system inoperable. Dry pipe systems are most often used in unheated buildings, in parking garages, in outside canopies attached to heated buildings (within which a wet pipe system would also be provided), or in refrigerated coolers. In regions using NFPA regulations, wet pipe systems cannot be installed unless the range of ambient temperatures remains above .

Water is not present in the piping until the system operates; instead, the piping is filled with dry air at a pressure below the water supply pressure. To prevent the larger water supply pressure from prematurely forcing water into the piping, the design of the dry pipe valve (a specialized type of check valve) results in a greater force on top of the check valve clapper by the use of a larger valve clapper area exposed to the piping air pressure, as compared to the higher water pressure but smaller clapper surface area.

When one or more of the automatic sprinkler heads is triggered, it opens, allowing the air in the piping to vent from that sprinkler. Each sprinkler operates independently, as its temperature rises above its triggering threshold. As the air pressure in the piping drops, the pressure differential across the dry pipe valve changes, allowing water to enter the piping system. Water flow from sprinklers, needed to control the fire, is delayed until the air is vented from the sprinklers. In regions using NFPA 13 regulations, the time it takes water to reach the hydraulically remote sprinkler from the time that sprinkler is activated is limited to a maximum of 60 seconds.  In industry practice, this is known as the "Maximum Time of Water Delivery". The maximum time of water delivery may be required to be reduced, depending on the hazard classification of the area protected by the sprinkler system.

Some property owners and building occupants may view dry pipe sprinklers as advantageous for protection of valuable collections and other water-sensitive areas. This perceived benefit is due to a fear that wet system piping may slowly leak water without attracting notice, while dry pipe systems should not fail in this manner.

Disadvantages of using dry pipe fire sprinkler systems include:
If the sprinklers share the same standpipe system as the standpipe system which supplies fire hoses, then the water supply to the fire hoses would be severely reduced or even curtailed altogether.
 Increased complexity: Dry pipe systems require additional control equipment and air pressure supply components, which increases system complexity. This puts a premium on proper maintenance, as this increase in system complexity results in an inherently less-reliable overall system (i.e. more single failure points) as compared to a wet pipe system.
 Higher installation and maintenance costs: The added complexity impacts the overall dry-pipe installation cost, and increases maintenance expenditure primarily due to added service labor costs.
 Lower design flexibility: Regulatory requirements limit the maximum permitted size (i.e. 750 gallons) of individual dry-pipe systems, unless additional components and design efforts are provided to limit the time from sprinkler activation to water discharge to under 60 seconds. These limitations may increase the number of individual sprinkler zones (i.e. served from a single riser) that must be provided in the building, and impact the ability of an owner to make system additions.
 Increased fire response time: Because the piping is empty at the time the sprinkler operates, there is an inherent time delay in delivering water to the sprinklers which have operated while the water travels from the riser to the sprinkler, partially filling the piping in the process. A maximum of 60 seconds is normally allowed by regulatory requirements from the time a single sprinkler opens until water is discharged onto the fire. This delay in fire suppression results in a larger fire prior to control, increasing property damage.

 Increased corrosion potential: Following operation or testing, dry-pipe sprinkler system piping should be drained, but residual water collects in piping low spots, and moisture is also retained in the atmosphere within the piping. This moisture, coupled with the oxygen available in the compressed air in the piping, increases internal pipe corrosion, eventually leading to pin-hole leaks or other piping failures. The internal corrosion rate in wet pipe systems (in which the piping is constantly full of water) is much lower, as the amount of oxygen available for the corrosion process is more limited. Corrosion can be combated by using copper or stainless steel pipe which are less susceptible to corrosion, or by using dry nitrogen gas to pressurize the system, rather than air. Nitrogen generators can be used as a permanent source of nitrogen gas, which is beneficial because dry pipe sprinkler systems require an uninterrupted supply of supervisory gas. These additional precautions can increase the up-front cost of the system, but will help prevent system failure, increased maintenance costs, and premature need for system replacement in the future.

Deluge
"Deluge" systems are systems in which all sprinklers connected to the water piping system are open, in that the heat sensing operating element is removed, or specifically designed as such. These systems are used for special hazards where rapid fire spread is a concern, as they provide a simultaneous application of water over the entire hazard. They are sometimes installed in personnel egress paths or building openings to slow travel of fire (e.g. openings in a fire-rated wall).

Water is not present in the piping until the system operates. Because the sprinkler orifices are open, the piping is at atmospheric pressure. To prevent the water supply pressure from forcing water into the piping, a "deluge valve" (a mechanically latched valve) is used in the water supply connection. It is a non-resetting valve, and stays open once tripped.

Because the heat sensing elements normally present in automatic sprinklers have been removed (resulting in open sprinkler heads), the deluge valve is opened via a signal from the fire alarm system which utilizes fire detectors. The type of fire alarm initiating device is selected mainly based on the hazard (e.g. pilot sprinklers, smoke detectors, heat detectors, or optical flame detectors). The initiation device signals the fire alarm panel, which in turn signals the deluge valve to open. Activation can also be via an electric or pneumatic fire alarm pull station which signals the fire alarm panel to signal the deluge valve to open.

Pre-action
Pre-action sprinkler systems are specialized for use in locations where accidental activation is especially undesirable, such as in museums with rare art works, manuscripts, or books; and data centers, for protection of computer equipment from accidental water discharge.

Pre-action systems are hybrids of wet, dry, and deluge systems, depending on the exact system goal. There are two main sub-types of pre-action systems: single interlock, and double interlock.

The operation of single interlock systems are similar to dry systems except that these systems require that a "preceding" fire detection event, typically the activation of a heat or smoke detector takes place prior to the "action" of water introduction into the system's piping by opening the pre-action valve which is a mechanically latched valve (i.e. similar to a deluge valve). In this way, the system is essentially converted from a dry system into a wet system. The intent is to reduce the undesirable time delay of water delivery to sprinklers that is inherent in dry systems. Prior to fire detection, if the sprinkler operates, or the piping system develops a leak, loss of air pressure in the piping will activate a trouble alarm. In this case, the pre-action valve will not open due to loss of supervisory pressure, and water will not enter the piping.

Double interlock systems require that both a "preceding" fire detection event, typically the activation of a heat or smoke detector, and an automatic sprinkler operation take place prior to the "action" of water introduction into the system's piping. Activation of either the fire detectors alone, or sprinklers alone, without the concurrent operation of the other will not allow water to enter the piping. Because water does not enter the piping until a sprinkler operates, double interlock systems are considered as dry systems in terms of water delivery times, and similarly require a larger design area.

Electronic
Electronic sprinkler systems are systems comprising sprinklers in which the heat sensing operating element is replaced by electronic sensing and electronically triggered actuation. Sprinkler operation is often controlled via an algorithm that determines which sprinklers will operate and when. These systems are often used in scenarios that require fast response and controlled sprinkler operations, such as high-ceiling pallet racking storage with fast-burning commodities or dense storage applications.

Foam water
A foam water fire sprinkler system is a special application system, discharging a mixture of water and low expansion foam concentrate, resulting in a foam spray from the sprinkler. These systems are usually used with special hazards occupancies associated with high challenge fires, such as flammable liquids, and airport hangars. Operation is as described above, depending on the system type into which the foam is injected.

Water spray
"Water spray" systems are operationally identical to a deluge system, but the piping and discharge nozzle spray patterns are designed to protect a uniquely configured hazard, usually being three-dimensional components or equipment (i.e. as opposed to a deluge system, which is designed to cover the horizontal floor area of a room). The nozzles used may not be listed fire sprinklers, and are usually selected for a specific spray pattern to conform to the three-dimensional nature of the hazard (e.g. typical spray patterns being oval, fan, full circle, narrow jet). Examples of hazards protected by water spray systems are electrical transformers containing oil for cooling or turbo-generator bearings. Water spray systems can also be used externally on the surfaces of tanks containing flammable liquids or gases (such as hydrogen). Here the water spray is intended to cool the tank and its contents to prevent tank rupture/explosion (BLEVE) and fire spread.

Water mist
Water mist systems are used for special hazards applications. This type of system is typically used where water damage may be a concern, or where water supplies are limited.  NFPA 750 defines water mist as a water spray with a droplet size of "less than 1000 microns at the minimum operation pressure of the discharge nozzle".  The droplet size can be controlled by adjusting the discharge pressure through a nozzle of a fixed orifice size. The fire suppression mechanisms provided by water mist systems include cooling, local flame oxygen reduction, and radiation blocking.  

In operation, water mist systems can operate with the same functionality as deluge, wet pipe, dry pipe, or pre-action systems. The difference is that a water mist system uses a compressed gas as an atomizing medium, which is pumped through the sprinkler pipe. Instead of compressed gas, some systems use a high-pressure pump to pressurize the water so it atomizes as it exits the sprinkler nozzle. Systems can be applied using local application method or total flooding method, similar to Clean Agent Fire Protection Systems.

Design
This chart from the fire safety standards 
indicates the color of the bulb and the 
respective operating temperature.

Sprinkler systems are intended to either control the fire or to suppress the fire. Control mode sprinklers are intended to control the heat release rate of the fire to prevent building structure collapse, and pre-wet the surrounding combustibles to prevent fire spread. The fire is not extinguished until the burning combustibles are exhausted or manual extinguishment is effected by firefighters. Suppression mode sprinklers (formerly known as Early Suppression Fast Response (ESFR) sprinklers) are intended to result in a severe sudden reduction of the heat release rate of the fire, followed quickly by complete extinguishment, prior to manual intervention.

Most sprinkler systems installed today are designed using an area and density approach. First the building use and building contents are analyzed to determine the level of fire hazard. Usually buildings are classified as light hazard, ordinary hazard group 1, ordinary hazard group 2, extra hazard group 1, or extra hazard group 2. After determining the hazard classification, a design area and density can be determined by referencing tables in the National Fire Protection Association (NFPA) standards. The design area is a theoretical area of the building representing the worst case area where a fire could burn. The design density is a measurement of how much water per square foot of floor area should be applied to the design area.

After the design area and density have been determined, calculations are performed to prove that the system can deliver the required amount of water over the required design area. These calculations account for all of the pressure that is lost or gained between the water supply source and the sprinklers that would operate in the design area. This includes pressure losses due to friction inside the piping and losses or gains due to elevational differences between the source and the discharging sprinklers. Sometimes momentum pressure from water velocity inside the piping is also calculated. Typically these calculations are performed using computer software, but before the advent of computer systems these sometimes complicated calculations were performed by hand. This skill of calculating sprinkler systems by hand is still required training for a sprinkler system design technologist who seeks senior level certification from engineering certification organizations such as the National Institute for Certification in Engineering Technologies (NICET).

Sprinkler systems in residential structures are becoming more common, as the cost of such systems becomes more practical and the benefits become more obvious. Residential sprinkler systems usually fall under a residential classification separate from the commercial classifications mentioned above. A commercial sprinkler system is designed to protect the structure and the occupants from a fire. Most residential sprinkler systems are primarily designed to suppress a fire in such a way to allow for the safe escape of the building occupants. While these systems will often also protect the structure from major fire damage, this is a secondary consideration. In residential structures, sprinklers are often omitted from closets, bathrooms, balconies, garages and attics because a fire in these areas would not usually impact the occupant's escape route.

Costs and effectiveness
In 2008, the installed costs of sprinkler systems ranged from US$0.31 – $3.66 per square foot, depending on type and location. Residential systems, installed at the time of initial home construction and utilizing municipal water supplies, average about US$0.35/square foot. 

Systems can be installed during initial construction, or retrofitted. Some communities have laws requiring residential sprinkler systems, especially where large municipal hydrant water supplies ("fire flows") are not available. Nationwide in the United States, one and two-family homes generally do not require fire sprinkler systems, although the overwhelming loss of life due to fires occurs in these spaces. Residential sprinkler systems are inexpensive (about the same per square foot as carpeting or floor tiling), but require larger water supply piping than is normally installed in homes, so retrofitting is usually cost prohibitive.

According to the National Fire Protection Association (NFPA), fires in hotels with sprinklers averaged 78% less damage than fires in hotels without them (1983–1987). The NFPA says the average loss per fire in buildings with sprinklers was $2,300, compared to an average loss of $10,300 in unsprinklered buildings. However, in a purely economic comparison, this is not a complete picture; the total costs of fitting, and the costs arising from non-fire triggered release must be factored.

The NFPA states that it "has no record of a fire killing more than two people in a completely sprinklered building where a sprinkler system was properly operating, except in an explosion or flash fire or where industrial fire brigade members or employees were killed during fire suppression operations." Elsewhere it has stated, "NFPA has no record of a multiple fatality in a fully sprinklered building where the system operated."

The world's largest fire sprinkler manufacturer is the Fire Protection Products division of Tyco International.

See also

 Active fire protection
 Architectural engineering
 Fire protection
 Fire protection engineering
 Listing and approval use and compliance
 Passive fire protection
 Pipe support
 Sprinkler fitting
 Victaulic

References

External links

 National Fire Protection Association

Firefighting equipment
Active fire protection
Safety equipment
Hydraulics
Plumbing
Piping
Fire suppression